Tsarevets Buttress (‘Rid Tsarevets’ \'rid tsa-'re-vets\) is the rounded ice-covered buttress extending  in north-south direction and  in east-west direction, rising to 1868 m on Trinity Peninsula in Graham Land, Antarctica. It is situated on the northwest side of Detroit Plateau, and is connected to Korten Ridge on the west-northwest by Podvis Col. The feature has steep and partly ice-free southwest, north and east slopes, surmounting Temple Glacier to the southwest, Sabine Glacier to the northwest and Whitecloud Glacier to the north-northeast and east.

The buttress is named after Tsarevets Hill in the city of Veliko Tarnovo, the seat of the Bulgarian royal court in the 12th–14th centuries.

Location
German-British mapping in 1996.

Maps
 Trinity Peninsula. Scale 1:250000 topographic map No. 5697. Institut für Angewandte Geodäsie and British Antarctic Survey, 1996.
 Antarctic Digital Database (ADD). Scale 1:250000 topographic map of Antarctica. Scientific Committee on Antarctic Research (SCAR), 1993–2016.

Notes

References
 Bulgarian Antarctic Gazetteer. Antarctic Place-names Commission. (details in Bulgarian, basic data in English)
 Tsarevets Buttress. SCAR Composite Antarctic Gazetteer

External links
 Tsarevets Buttress. Copernix satellite image

Mountains of Trinity Peninsula
Bulgaria and the Antarctic